Francis Jocky is a singer, songwriter and producer, born in Cameroon and moved to France at age of 15.
He learned to play the guitar at age of 9 and by age 12 he played piano and started composing his first songs. After moving to France he received his PhD in International Relations from Sorbonne University. Already during his studies he knew that music would be the center of his life and he regularly performed as a pianist and singer in various clubs in France and around the world. At one of his performances in Monte Carlo he was approached by Jon Anderson who noticed his talent. The two wrote "The more you know" in 1998. This record was released by Eagle Rock Entertainment.
He also got accolades from artist such as Stevie Wonder and Bono while sharing the microphone with them.
In 2004, at the request of Eagle Rock Entertainment, he released under the name FJ & Living Souls the record 'Ambient Africa'. This record features vocal recordings from South African artists, recorded during the Apartheid by SABC. It held Number one positions for weeks on various radio stations in Canada and was featured in the Top 10 charts of US radio stations as well.
Francis Jocky released two solo records, 'Mr. Pain' and 'Sanctified'.

In 2010, he collaborated with Japanese singer-songwriter Misia and DJ M2J on the track "Maware Maware" for Listen Up! The Official 2010 FIFA World Cup Album. The first performance of the song was before Japan and Cameroon's match in the 2010 FIFA World Cup.

References

External links 
 Myspace
 Francis Jocky

Living people
21st-century Cameroonian male singers
Male singer-songwriters
Year of birth missing (living people)